Kabak Too is a mountain range in the inner Tian Shan in Naryn Region, Kyrgyzstan. It is located between Jumgal and Ming-Kush valleys. The length of the range is about 40 km, width - up to 16 km. The highest point is Kashkasuu Chokusu - .

References

Mountain ranges of Kyrgyzstan
Naryn Region